Virgin High is a 1991 direct-to-video sex comedy film directed and produced by Richard Gabai.  Gabai co-wrote the film with Jeff Neill and stars with Traci Dali, Burt Ward, and Linnea Quigley.  Gabai plays the boyfriend of a teenage girl sent to Catholic school, which he attempts to bluff his way into so they can have sex.
It was also the first film appearance of Leslie Mann.

Plot 
When Christy Murphy's strict parents become suspicious that she's fooling around with boys, they send her to an all-girls Catholic school.  Her boyfriend, Jerry, bluffs his way into the school disguised as a priest.  Determined to have sex with Christy, Jerry attempts to avoid the nuns while maintaining his cover.

Cast 
 Burt Ward as Dick Murphy
 Linnea Quigley as Kathleen
 Traci Dali as Christy Murphy
 Richard Gabai as Jerry
 Kent Burden as Theo

Release 
RCA/Columbia Pictures Home Entertainment released the film direct-to-video in January 1991.

Reception 
Varietys review said that it is "uneven but boasts better writing than most teen sex comedies".  The review in TV Guide called it harmless but "nearly pointless and rather dull".  Drive-in film critic Joe Bob Briggs sarcastically recommended Virgin High as a family film, rating it two stars.

References

External links 
 

1991 films
1990s sex comedy films
American sex comedy films
1990s English-language films
Films about virginity
Films directed by Richard Gabai
1990s American films